Westmount–Saint-Louis is a provincial electoral district in the Montreal region of Quebec, Canada that elects members to the National Assembly of Quebec. It comprises the city of Westmount as well as parts of the Le Plateau-Mont-Royal and Ville-Marie boroughs of Montreal, including most of downtown.

It was created for the 1994 election from parts of Saint-Louis, Westmount and Sainte-Anne electoral districts.

In the change from the 2001 to the 2011 electoral map, it lost a very small amount of territory to the Saint-Henri–Sainte-Anne electoral district.

Linguistic demographics
Allophone: 38.9%
Anglophone:  37.0%
Francophone: 24.1%

Members of the National Assembly

Election results

* Result compared to Action démocratique

* Result compared to UFP

|-

|-

|-

|}

|-

|Socialist Democracy
|Sorem Kvist
|align="right"|224
|align="right"|0.68
|align="right"|-0.03
|-

|Natural Law
|Allen Faguy
|align="right"|130
|align="right"|0.39
|align="right"|+0.09
|-

|-

|}

|-

|-

|-

|-

|New Democrat
|Armand Vaillancourt
|align="right"|239
|align="right"|0.71
|-

|CANADA!
|Rudolph Scalzo
|align="right"|137
|align="right"|0.41
|-

|Natural Law
|Allen Faguy
|align="right"|100
|align="right"|0.30
|-

|-

|Economic
|Gérald Bouffard
|align="right"|55
|align="right"|0.16

|-

|Independent (CL)
|Michel Prairie
|align="right"|24 	  	
|align="right"|0.07
|}

References

External links
Information
 Elections Quebec

Election results
 Election results (National Assembly)
 Election results (QuébecPolitique)

Maps
 2011 map (PDF)
 2001 map (Flash)
2001–2011 changes (Flash)
1992–2001 changes (Flash)
 Electoral map of Montreal region
 Quebec electoral map, 2011

Provincial electoral districts of Montreal
Quebec provincial electoral districts
Westmount, Quebec
Ville-Marie, Montreal
Le Plateau-Mont-Royal